This is a list of Sejm Marshals, or Speakers of the Sejm (the Lower house of the Polish Parliament) since its establishment as a regular convening body in the late 15th century, until now.

Crown of the Kingdom of Poland

Polish–Lithuanian Commonwealth

Partitioned Poland (1795–1918)

Duchy of Warsaw

Polish Kingdom

Diet of Galicia and Lodomeria

Second Polish Republic (1918–39)

Polish People's Republic

Republic of Poland (after 1989)

See also
 Marshal of the Senate of the Republic of Poland

Notes and references

Sejm Marshals
 
Sejm Marshals
Poland, Sejm Marshals